Parisotoma notabilis is a species of elongate-bodied springtail in the family Isotomidae. It can be found in both Europe and North America, with four distinct lineages differing significantly in both mitochondrial and nuclear genetics. The species reproduces by parthenogenesis.

References

Further reading

External links

 

Collembola
Animals described in 1896
Arthropods of Europe
Arthropods of North America